Patrik Tybor (born 16 September 1987) is a Slovak cyclist, who currently rides for UCI Continental team .

Major results

2007
 4th Puchar Ministra Obrony Narodowej
 5th Overall Tour d'Egypte
 6th Overall Grand Prix Cycliste de Gemenc
 9th GP Palma
 10th Memoriał Henryka Łasaka
2008
 10th Memoriał Henryka Łasaka
2009
 1st Stage 2 Grand Prix Bradlo
 2nd Time trial, National Under-23 Road Championships
2011
 2nd GP Betonexpressz 2000
 10th Road race, Summer Universiade
2012
 3rd Road race, National Road Championships
 7th Tour Bohemia
2013
 1st Stage 4 Baltic Chain Tour
 3rd Road race, National Road Championships
 3rd Overall Tour de Serbie
 6th Tour Bohemia
 9th GP Kranj
2014
 Visegrad 4 Bicycle Race
2nd GP Slovakia
5th GP Czech Republic
 3rd Time trial, National Road Championships
2015
 National Road Championships
3rd Road race
3rd Time trial
 3rd Overall Tour of Bulgaria
1st Points classification
1st Stages 1 & 3
 4th Overall Tour de Hongrie
 6th Rund um Sebnitz
 8th Memoriał Andrzeja Trochanowskiego
 9th Overall Okolo Slovenska
1st  Slovak rider classification
 9th Korona Kocich Gór
 10th GP Hungary, Visegrad 4 Bicycle Race
2016
 1st Stage 6 Tour du Cameroun
 2nd Overall Tour du Maroc
1st Stage 5
 4th Kerékpárverseny, Visegrad 4 Bicycle Race
 7th Overall Sharjah International Cycling Tour
2017
 National Road Championships
2nd Time trial
5th Road race
 4th Overall Grand Prix Cycliste de Gemenc
 4th GP Czech Republic, Visegrad 4 Bicycle Race
 5th Overall Tour du Cameroun
 7th Overall Okolo Slovenska
 8th Overall Tour de Hongrie
2018
 2nd Time trial, National Road Championships
 6th Debrecen–Ibrany, V4 Special Series
2019
 2nd Grand Prix Velo Erciyes
 2nd Puchar Uzdrowisk Karpackich
 National Road Championships
3rd Road race
3rd Time trial
 V4 Special Series
5th Vasarosnameny–Nyiregyhaza
6th Debrecen–Ibrany

References

External links 
 Patrik Tybor at the Slovenský Olympijský Výbor 
 

1987 births
Living people
Slovak male cyclists
Cyclists at the 2016 Summer Olympics
Olympic cyclists of Slovakia
People from Dubnica nad Váhom
Sportspeople from the Trenčín Region
European Games competitors for Slovakia
Cyclists at the 2019 European Games